Sheboygan Falls may refer to:

 Sheboygan Falls, Wisconsin
 Sheboygan Falls (town), Wisconsin